Fällfors is a town located in Västerbotten, Sweden. The nearby town to Fällfors is Jörn.

References 

Populated places in Västerbotten County